is a 2010 Japanese film directed by Go Ohara. It stars Rina Akiyama, Ruito Aoyagi, Minami Tsukui, Misaki Momose, Yurei Yanagi, Masahito Okamoto, Satoshi Hakuzen and Asami Sugiura.

Plot
Yuki (Rina Akiyama) lives with her father Jiro (Yurei Yanagi) and her mother Kayako (Fumie Nakajima) in Tokyo. Their peaceful lives are disturbed when a group of assassins slaughter Kayako and injure Jiro. Yuki seeks revenge by cladding herself in Gothic Lolita fashion and killing off the assassins.

Release and reception
The film was shown at the Tokyo International Film Festival on October 25, 2010. The film was released on DVD in North America by Tokyo Shock on May 24, 2011 under the title Psycho Gothic Lolita.

The Hollywood Reporter gave a mixed review, praising the film's "lightning pace" and stating that "several sequences involving Yuki and her Lolita garb are subtly witty" while saying it never reaches the heights of special effects designer Yoshihiro Nishimura's films.

Notes

External links
 Official website on Archive.org
 

2010 films
Films set in Tokyo
Japanese action films
2010 action films
2010s Japanese films